The Greater Manchester Police, Fire and Crime Panel is the police and crime panel for Greater Manchester. The purpose of the panel is to scrutinise the directly elected Mayor of Greater Manchester, and their appointed Deputy Mayor for Policing, Crime, Criminal Justice and Fire, who are responsible for the Greater Manchester Police and the Greater Manchester Fire and Rescue Service.

History
In June 2020 the panel was given oversight of the Greater Manchester Combined Authority's fire and rescue functions and was renamed from the Greater Manchester Police and Crime Panel to the Greater Manchester Police, Fire and Crime panel.

Membership
The panel is made up of one councillor from each local authority in Greater Manchester who sit alongside two additional independent members that have been co-opted because of their relevant skills, knowledge and experience.

 the panel's members are:

 Janet Emsley  (chair)
 Kevin Anderson 
 Allison Gwynne 
 Steve Williams 
 Amanda Peers 
 Graham Whitham 
 David Lancaster 
 Richard Gold 
 Rabnawaz Akbar 
 Mudasir Dean 
 Angela Lawrence (Independent Member)
 Majid Hussain (Independent Member)

References

Greater Manchester Police
Police and crime panels in England